Cohn-Brandt-Cohn (CBC) Film Sales Corporation (also known as CBC Film Sales or simply CBC) was an American film studio that was founded on June 19, 1918 by brothers Harry and Jack Cohn and their friend and co-worker at Independent Moving Pictures, Joe Brandt with $250 of capital ($5,063 in late-2022 dollars). The headquarters were at 1600 Broadway in New York. 

Brandt was the president of CBC Film Sales, handling sales, marketing and distribution from New York along with Jack Cohn, while Harry Cohn ran production in Hollywood. CBC Film's early productions were low-budget short subjects: Screen Snapshots (started in 1920), the "Hall Room Boys" (the vaudeville duo of Edward Flanagan and Neely Edwards), and the Chaplin imitator Billy West. The start-up CBC leased space in a Poverty Row studio at 6070 Sunset Boulevard in 1922. The studio released its first feature film More to Be Pitied Than Scorned on August 20, 1922. Its success led the company to open its own film exchanges.

Among Hollywood's elite, the studio's small-time reputation led some to joke that "CBC" stood for "Corned Beef and Cabbage". The studio's last film to be released was Innocence on December 1, 1923. The Cohn brothers renamed the CBC Film Sales as Columbia Pictures on January 10, 1924, in hopes to improve its image.

Filmography

See also 
 Columbia Pictures

References 

American film studios
Columbia Pictures